Sukromli is a rural locality (a selo) in Semyonovsky Selsoviet of Svobodnensky District, Amur Oblast, Russia. The population was 130 as of 2018. There are 2 streets.

Geography 
Sukromli is located 29 km northwest of Svobodny (the district's administrative centre) by road. Semyonovka is the nearest rural locality.

References 

Rural localities in Svobodnensky District